This is a complete list of Kentucky Wildcats men's basketball teams seasons, from their first season in 1903 to present.

History

Season-by-season results
The following is a list of Kentucky Wildcats men's basketball seasons, with records and notable accomplishments.

Notes
  Due to several Kentucky players found to be involved in a point-shaving scandal, the NCAA banned the school from the 1953 NCAA tournament and asked its member institutions to boycott playing the Wildcats. Thus, Kentucky's 1952—53 season was cancelled.
  After defeating LSU in a one-game playoff to win the 1954 SEC championship, three Kentucky players were ruled ineligible for the postseason because they had graduated in 1953 (when UK was banned from competing). As a result, Kentucky declined an invitation to the NCAA Tournament in protest.
  Two victories (and one loss) from the NCAA Tournament were vacated in the 1987-88 season as part of NCAA sanctions. Kentucky was also stripped of 1987-88's SEC regular season and SEC Tournament championships.
  Kentucky was banned from the 1989-90 and 1990-91 NCAA and SEC Tournaments due to sanctions from the Eddie Sutton era.
  Kentucky finished first in the SEC standings in 1990-91 season. However, due to probation and their tournament ban, they were ineligible for the regular-season championship. (The title was awarded to LSU instead.)

References

Kentucky
 
1952 in sports in Kentucky
1953 in sports in Kentucky
Kentucky Wildcats basketball seasons